The  occurred at Kyoto Animation's Studio 1 building in the Fushimi ward of Kyoto, Kyoto Prefecture, Japan, on the morning of 18 July 2019. The arson killed thirty-six (36) people, injured an additional thirty-four (34) (including the suspect), and destroyed most of the materials and computers in Studio 1. It is one of the deadliest massacres in Japan since the end of World War II, the deadliest building fire in Japan since the 2001 Myojo 56 building fire, and the first massacre ever to have occurred at a studio associated with an entertainment company, and the animation industry.

Witnesses stated they heard him accusing the studio of plagiarism. After awaiting his recovery from life-threatening burns for more than ten months, the police arrested 42-year-old Shinji Aoba on suspicion of murder and other offenses on 27 May 2020, and he was formally indicted on 16 December 2020.

As a result of the incident, some works and collaborations by the studio were delayed, and several events were suspended or cancelled.

Background

Kyoto Animation is one of Japan's most acclaimed anime studios, known for titles such as The Melancholy of Haruhi Suzumiya, K-On! and Clannad. It has several different locations in Kyoto: Studio 1 (in Fushimi ward); Studio 2 (the head office), and Studio 5. Their merchandise development division is in Uji, one train station away from Studio 1. The building was used mainly by the animation production staff, and was constructed in 2007.

In the year leading up to the attack, Kyoto Animation had received over 200 death threats. Company president Hideaki Hatta said they did not know if the threats were related to the incident, as they were sent anonymously, but he had informed police and lawyers of them. After the National Police Agency were informed of these threats in October 2018, they temporarily patrolled the head office at the time.

Incident
The fire began with an explosion at around 10:31 a.m. The police believed that the gasoline dispersed on site mixed with the air, causing the explosion at the start. The perpetrator is reported to have been shouting  as he carried out the attack. He also poured gasoline over some individuals before setting them alight—setting himself on fire in the process—causing them to run out into the street in flames.

As the fire grew by the entrance, staff members were trapped inside the building. Twenty bodies were found on the stairs from the third floor to the roof, evidently indicating that the victims were attempting to escape. Tomoaki Nishino, associate professor at Disaster Prevention Research Institute of Kyoto University, estimated that the second and third floors were almost filled with smoke within 30 seconds of the explosion. The perpetrator fled the scene but was chased by two Kyoto Animation employees and soon collapsed on the street, where he was apprehended by police. Multiple unused knives were found lying by the scene.

The fire was under control at 3:19 p.m. (06:19 UTC), and extinguished at 6:20 a.m. on the next day (21:20 UTC). Once the rescue efforts had ended, it was confirmed that all people in the studio had been accounted for. The building did not have fire sprinklers or indoor fire hydrants due to its classification as a small office building, but had no deficiencies in fire safety compliance during its last inspection on 17 October 2018. Initial reports claimed the studio's entrance required employee pass-cards, but the door was left unlocked as the studio was expecting visitors. However, this was inaccurate: there was no security system in place and the door was always left unlocked during business hours.

The arson attack destroyed most of Kyoto Animation's materials and computers in Studio 1, though a small portion of keyframes were on exhibition in Tokushima and hence spared destruction. On 29 July, Kyoto Animation reported that it successfully recovered some digitized original drawings from a server that survived the fire.

The attack is reported to be one of the deadliest massacres in Japan's history since the end of World War II and the deadliest building fire in the country since the Myojo 56 building fire in 2001. It was considered "suicidal terrorism" by one criminology professor at Rissho University, as the attack was reportedly intended to be a suicide mission by the suspect.

Victims
Seventy people were inside Studio 1 at the time of the fire. Initially it was reported that 34 people had been killed before two more later died at a hospital. Some victims were difficult to identify, according to the Kyoto police, because they had been burned beyond recognition. Autopsy results released on 22 July 2019 revealed that a majority of victims had succumbed to burns (rather than carbon monoxide poisoning) due to the quick-spreading fire. DNA testing was done to aid in identifications, which lasted up to a week after the attack. It was reported that two-thirds of the victims (at least 20) were women, as the studio was known for hiring female animators. The president of Kyoto Animation asked the media through the police not to release the names of the victims out of respect for their families, stating that "releasing their names does nothing to serve the public good." On 25 July, Kyoto police said they had identified all 34 victims and had started to return the bodies of the victims to their relatives.

Meanwhile, discussions were ongoing with Kyoto Animation on if, when, and how to reveal the identities of the deceased. Some of the families released their own findings early to the media regarding the status of their loved ones. The family of color designer Naomi Ishida confirmed her death on 24 July. Animator, scriptwriter, and director Yasuhiro Takemoto was confirmed dead by his family through DNA testing on 26 July. The first post-fire death occurred on 27 July which brought the number of deceased to 35. On 2 August, Kyoto police released the names of ten victims (including the people already mentioned) whose funerals had finished and relatives' consents obtained, and it was confirmed on the same day that animation directors Yoshiji Kigami and Futoshi Nishiya were among the dead. The remaining 25 victims were officially revealed on 27 August as the social impact of the case became a factor. On 4 October 2019, it was announced that one woman died from septic shock, bringing the death toll to 36. 

It was initially reported that 36 people were injured, but this figure dropped to 34 after two people later died at the hospital. By 18 September it was reported that all thirty-four (34) people injured in the attack were no longer in life-threatening condition. Some still remained in the intensive care unit (ICU) with severe burns. According to the South Korean Ministry of Foreign Affairs, one of the injured victims was a South Korean woman. Those who were reported safe include animation director Naoko Yamada, who directed K-On!, A Silent Voice and Liz and the Blue Bird.

Accused 
, a 41-year-old man, was identified as the suspect by police and a warrant was quickly issued for his arrest.

According to locals, a man resembling Aoba was spotted near Studio 1 days before the incident. He was also reported to have visited several places of interest related to Sound! Euphonium around the city in days prior to the attack.

During his transport to the hospital, Aoba admitted to having started the fire, possibly for revenge, accusing the studio of  his novels. In spite of this, Hatta had initially stated that there is no record of anyone submitting work to their annual writing contest under Aoba's name. Subsequently, Kyoto Animation revealed that they had received a draft novel from Aoba; however, it did not pass the first-stage assessment and was forgotten, and its contents were confirmed to have no similarities to any of their published works. It was later revealed that Aoba believed that a scene about buying discounted meat in the fifth episode of Tsurune was similar to one in the novel he submitted.

Due to serious burns sustained during the incident, Aoba was transferred to a university hospital in Osaka for further treatment, where he received necessary skin graft surgery. On 5 September 2019, it was reported that his injuries were no longer considered life-threatening, but he was still being treated in an ICU and required respiratory assistance from a ventilator. Aoba regained speech on 18 September and began rehabilitation by 8 October, being able to sit up on a wheelchair and hold short conversations. The police obtained a warrant for his arrest, but were required to await confirmation from doctors that Aoba could withstand confinement. 

On 14 November 2019, he was moved to another hospital in Kyoto for final rehabilitation. He recovered from most of his injuries and acknowledged responsibility for the attack. He expressed feelings of remorse and gratitude towards the hospital staff, who he said treated him better than anyone had ever done in his life. On the other hand, he told police that he lit the fire because Kyoto Animation had stolen his novel, and that he expected to get the death penalty. Most of Aoba's burned skin was replaced with experimental artificial skin as the victims were prioritized to receive donor human skin first. The use of artificial skin on such extensive burns is the first case in Japan. 

By January 2020, Aoba remained hospitalized, and was unable to stand or eat unassisted. On 27 May 2020, Aoba was judged to have sufficiently recovered from his burn injuries, and he was formally arrested on suspicion of murder and other charges. He was indicted on 16 December 2020 on murder and other charges.

Aoba had a prior criminal history and a mental illness. In 2012, he robbed a convenience store with a knife in Ibaraki Prefecture and was subsequently jailed for three-and-a-half years. It is speculated that Aoba's mental illness may reduce his maximum penalty for the attack from a death sentence to life imprisonment.

Aftermath 
One month after the arson attack, the victims began to return to work at the other Kyoto Animation studio. As of October 2019, while the number of Kyoto Animation employees decreased from 176 to 137, 27 of the surviving 33 victims returned to work with several having decided to take extended breaks to cope with the stress and anxiety brought by the attack.

The company has issued an official statement, requesting respect for the victims and their family members, and also stating that all future statements will be either through the police or their lawyers. The demolition process of the building was completed on 28 April 2020, with no further plans for the site revealed. In an earlier interview, Kyoto Animation's president Hideaki Hatta stated that he was considering replacing the building with a green public park and a memorial monument. However, residents in the neighbourhood did not wish for a memorial to be built as it would destroy "the peaceful lifestyle [of local residents]".

Due to recovery efforts, Kyoto Animation had suspended the 11th Kyoto Animation Awards, an annual award to discover new stories.

In November 2019, the studio had decided to continue training programmes for aspiring animators, in which trainees would be trained in movies, sketching and animations. Upon graduating from the programme, outstanding trainees could be recruited by the studio after being examined further.

Impact on productions
In response to this incident, a publicity event for the upcoming 2020 film Free! was cancelled. Kyoto Animation's Sound! Euphonium collaboration with Keihan Main Line was delayed, as was  episode 4 of BEM. The third episode of David Production's Fire Force, an anime series about firefighters and people dying from spontaneous combustion, was delayed for a week and released with the colours of the fires and narration modified. Subsequent episodes of Fire Force were dealt with in a similar manner. The studio decided to push on with premiering Violet Evergarden: Eternity and the Auto Memory Doll on 3 August 2019 at Germany's AnimagiC convention as originally scheduled. The Japanese theatrical screening dates were extended by an extra week and honored the victims in the end credits. Despite earlier news reports stating that the upcoming Violet Evergarden film would premiere as scheduled on 10 January 2020, it was later announced to be delayed to 24 April 2020, but as a result of the COVID-19 pandemic, the premiere was again delayed to 18 September 2020. An episode for Animation x Paralympic, originally due to be aired in August 2019, was eventually announced as cancelled on 28 February 2020, citing that they would be unable to complete it in time for the 2020 Paralympics.

Measures to prevent recurrence 
The Fire and Disaster Management Agency and the National Police Agency issued a notice on 25 July 2019, requiring gas stations to maintain sales records of people purchasing gasoline in refillable containers, which conform to fire safety regulations. Each record is to contain the buyer's personal information such as name, address, the purpose of the purchase, and quantity purchased. Although the notice had no legal backing, most buyers complied with this additional requirement voluntarily. This measure was formalised with the relevant regulations revised and coming into force on 1 February 2020 to make the sales records mandatory. Post incident, the Kyoto Municipal Fire Department formulated guidelines for evacuation in the event of arson or terrorism and encouraged the installation of evacuation ladders.

As a result of the attack, police in Japan are becoming more vigilant with each death threat directed at other companies (especially Khara, Square Enix, Animate, and Clannad developer company Key, all of which alluded to the incident and also received similar Kyoto Animation-referenced death threats), were able to identify the source of the threats, and arrested anyone who sent the threats before any further attacks transpire at these companies.

Memorial 
A tribute video was published, one year after the attack, on 18 July 2020. The company had considered holding a memorial ceremony, but in light of the COVID-19 pandemic in Japan, decided against it. Similarly, at 10:30 am JST on 18 July 2021, Kyoto Animation's YouTube channel streamed a 13-minute video to "provide a place for everyone to share their thoughts and feelings". In the video were messages and tributes from the studio, from staff members, and from the families of some of the deceased. The company requested that fans not visit the former site of Studio 1 on the anniversary of the incident to respect the wishes of local residents.

Reactions

Kyoto Animation accepted direct donations through a local bank account to help the victims of the attack from 23 July 2019 to 27 December 2019. The donations included separate  million donations from the Japanese musician Yoshiki and game developer Key. It was estimated that the company would require as much as  billion to cover the cost of supporting the victims and affected families and company-related business operating recovery expenses. As of November 2019, the company has begun the process of distributing the funds raised to the victims, with each victim receiving an appropriate amount after factoring various considerations such as severity of injuries, whether the victim is a sole breadwinner, etc.

Domestic
Prime Minister Shinzo Abe expressed his condolences and stated that he was "speechless" at the scale of the incident. A first in Japanese corporate history, a measure was passed in the National Diet to allow for donations to the studio to be tax-exempt. The Chinese, French, Philippine, and Belgian embassies in Japan provided their own words of condolence.

Numerous people and organisations related to the industry expressed concern and support, such as anime directors Makoto Shinkai and Tatsuki , K-On! voice actress Aki Toyosaki, The Melancholy of Haruhi Suzumiya voice actresses Aya Hirano, Minori Chihara, and Yūko Gotō, Hyōka author Honobu Yonezawa, Clannad developer company Key, and media company Kadokawa Corporation. Animation studios such as Shaft, Sunrise, Bandai Namco Pictures, Toei Animation, Bones, Khara, Trigger, Walt Disney Japan, and Madhouse all offered their support as well.

Animate, a major Japanese retailer of anime, video games, and manga, took donations at all of their stores to support the victims, and had raised over  million by 1 September.

International
Several foreign dignitaries, including Tsai Ing-wen, António Guterres, and others, offered their own messages of support for the victims.

In the wake of the fire, a GoFundMe appeal was launched by American anime licensor Sentai Filmworks. With a target of US$750,000, it surpassed the US$1 million donation mark within the first 24 hours. It had received US$2.3 million at the end of the appeal.  As of 7 December 2019, Sentai had transferred all of the funds raised, except for credit card processing fees, to Kyoto Animation studio.

Fans have also taken to Kyoto Animation's Japanese digital store to directly contribute by purchasing high-resolution downloadable images as they do not require staff to ship them. American licensing companies Aniplex of America, Funimation and Crunchyroll, and Nickelodeon Animation Studio, all offered their support. Adult Swim's anime-oriented Toonami block started their 20 July broadcast asking viewers to donate to the GoFundMe set up by Sentai Filmworks.

See also
 
 2019 in Japan
 2021 Osaka building fire
 Crime in Japan
 List of building or structure fires
 List of disasters in Japan by death toll
 Sennichi Department Store Building fire

Notes

References

External links

2019 crimes in Japan
2019 murders in Japan
2019 fires in Asia
2019 in animation
Arson in Japan
Arson in the 2010s
Attacks on buildings and structures in 2019
Attacks on buildings and structures in Asia
Attacks on office buildings
Building and structure fires in Japan
Commercial building fires
Murder in Kyoto
Disasters in Kyoto
July 2019 crimes in Asia
July 2019 events in Japan
Arson
Urban fires in Asia
Mass murder in 2019